Carey Dunlap Miller (1895–1985) was an American food scientist and a University of Hawaii at Manoa (UH) food and nutrition professor and department chair from 1922-1958.

Early life and education 
Miller was born to immigrant parents that owned a ranch in Idaho. She graduated from Boise High School in 1912. She received her bachelor's degree with honors from the University of California, Berkeley and later her master's degree at Columbia University.

Career 
Miller initially turned down an offer to be an assistant professor at University of Hawaii faculty in April 1922, from UH President Arthur L. Dean but eventually accepted. Miller was a UH food and nutrition professor and department chair from 1922-1958.

Research 
Miller studied Hawaiian diets and metabolism of locals, mainly Polynesians and Asians, and later published works on the composition of native foods. She also researched vitamin content in fresh and canned pineapples, guava, papaya, mangoes, and other local produce that proved significant health benefits.

Legacy
She was a pioneer in the field of food science who published research, developed the food science and nutrition programs at the University of Hawaii at Manoa, and provided $335,000 in scholarships and $670,000 to Hawai'i organizations after her death in 1985.

Bibliography

Selected books 
 Murai M, Pen Florence, Miller CD. "Some Tropical South Pacific Island Foods: Description, History, Use, Composition, and Nutritive Value." University of Hawaii Press. 1970.
 Miller CD. "Fruits of Hawaii Description, Nutritive Value, and Recipes." University of Hawaii Press. 1976.
 Miller CD, Robbins RC, Bazore K. "Some Fruits of Hawaii: Their Composition, Nutritive Value and Use in Tested Recipes." University Press of the Pacific. 2002.

References 

1895 births
1985 deaths
20th-century American scientists
20th-century American women scientists
American food scientists
Women food scientists
Scientists from Idaho
People from Boise, Idaho
Columbia University alumni
University of California, Berkeley alumni
University of Hawaiʻi at Mānoa faculty
American women academics